Vladyslav Serhiyovych Buhay (born 27 October 1997) is a Ukrainian footballer currently playing as a striker for Lviv.

Career
Buhay is a product of different Kievan youth football school systems, where his first trainer was Viktor Kashchey, but in 2015 he transferred to FC Shakhtar Donetsk.

From August 2016, he went on the one-year loan for the Ukrainian First League club FSC Bukovyna Chernivtsi.

References

External links
 
 

1997 births
Living people
Footballers from Kyiv
Ukrainian footballers
Association football forwards
FC Lokomotyv Kyiv players
FC Shakhtar Donetsk players
FC Bukovyna Chernivtsi players
FC Mariupol players
MFC Mykolaiv players
FC Chornomorets Odesa players
FC Lviv players
Ukrainian Premier League players
Ukrainian First League players
Ukraine youth international footballers